Ogilbia suarezae is a species of fish of the genus Ogilbia found in the shallows of the Caribbean Sea. It is yellowish in color and is livebearing.

Etymology 
It was named in honor of Susan Suarez, a professor at Cornell University, in recognition of her careful study of the reproductive biology of the related fish Ogilbia cayorum.

References

 Ogilbia suarezae Moller, Schwarzhans & Nielsen 2005, Aqua 10(4):194

External links
 The Ithaca Journal
 Cornell Chronicle

Bythitidae
Fish described in 2005